Arthur Township is the name of some places in the U.S. state of Minnesota:
Arthur Township, Kanabec County, Minnesota
Arthur Township, Traverse County, Minnesota

See also
Arthur Township (disambiguation)

Minnesota township disambiguation pages